National delimitation in the Union of Soviet Socialist Republics was the process of specifying well-defined national territorial units (Soviet socialist republics [SSR], autonomous Soviet socialist republics [ASSR], autonomous oblasts [provinces], raions [districts] and okrugs [circuits]) from the ethnic diversity of the Union of Soviet Socialist Republics (USSR) and its subregions. The Russian-language term for this Soviet state policy was razmezhevanie (natsionalno-territorialnoye razmezhevaniye), which is variously translated in English-language literature as "national-territorial delimitation" (NTD), "demarcation", or "partition". National delimitation formed part of a broader process of changes in administrative-territorial division, which also changed the boundaries of territorial units, but was not necessarily linked to national or ethnic considerations.
National delimitation in the USSR was distinct from nation-building, which typically referred to the policies and actions implemented by the government of a national territorial unit (a nation state) after delimitation. In most cases national delimitation in the USSR was followed by korenizatsiya (indigenization).

Policies of national delimitation in the Soviet Union
Pre-1917 Russia was an imperial state, not a nation state. In the 1905 Duma elections the nationalist parties received only 9 percent of all votes. The many non-Russian ethnic groups that inhabited the Russian Empire were classified as inorodtsy, or aliens. After the February Revolution, attitudes in regards to this topic began to change. In early 1917, a Socialist Revolutionary publication called Dyelo Naroda, No. 5 called for Russia to be transformed into a federal state along the lines of the United States. Specifically, separate constituent units inside of this federal state would be created for the various regions and ethnic groups of Russia (such as Little Russia, Georgia, Siberia, and Turkestan).

The Soviet Russia that took over from the Russian Empire in 1917 was not a nation-state, nor was the Soviet leadership committed to turning their country into such a state. In the early Soviet period, even voluntary assimilation was actively discouraged, and the promotion of the national self-consciousness of the non-Russian populations was attempted. Each officially recognized ethnic minority, however small, was granted its own national territory where it enjoyed a certain degree of autonomy, national schools, and national elites. A written national language (if it had been lacking), national language planning, native-language press, and books written in the native language came with the national territory, along with cultural institutions such as theaters.
The attitudes towards many ethnic minorities changed dramatically in the 1930s–1940s under the leadership of Joseph Stalin (despite his own Georgian ethnic roots) with the advent of a repressive policy featuring abolition of the national institutions, ethnic deportations, national terror, and Russification (mostly towards those with cross-border ethnic ties to foreign nation-states in the 1930s or compromised in the view of Stalin during the Great Patriotic War in the 1940s), although nation-building often continued simultaneously for others.
After the establishment of the Soviet Union within the boundaries of the former Russian Empire, the Bolshevik government began the process of national delimitation and nation building, which lasted through the 1920s and most of the 1930s. The project attempted to build nations out of the numerous ethnic groups in the Soviet Union. Defining a nation or politically conscious ethnic group was in itself a politically charged issue in the Soviet Union. In 1913, Stalin, in his work Marxism and the National Question, which subsequently became the cornerstone of the Soviet policy towards nationalities, defined a nation as "a historically constituted, stable community of people, formed on the basis of a common language, territory, economic life, and psychological makeup manifested in a common culture". Many of the subject nationalities or communities in the Russian Empire did not fully meet these criteria. Not only did cultural, linguistic, religious and tribal diversities make the process difficult, but also the lack of a political consciousness of ethnicity among the people was a major obstacle. The process relied on the Declaration of the Rights of the Peoples of Russia, adopted by the Bolshevik government on 15 November 1917, immediately after the October Revolution, which recognized equality and sovereignty of all the peoples of Russia; their right for free self-determination, up to and including secession and creation of an independent state; freedom of religion; and free development of national minorities and ethnic groups on the territory of Russia.

The Soviet Union (or more formally USSR – the Union of Soviet Socialist Republics) was established in 1922 as a federation of nationalities, which eventually came to encompass 15 major national territories, each organized as a Union-level republic (Soviet Socialist Republic or SSR). All 15 national republics, created between 1917 and 1940, had constitutionally equal rights and equal standing in the formal structure of state power. The largest of the 15 republics – Russia – was ethnically the most diverse and from the very beginning it was constituted as the RSFSR – the Russian Soviet Federative Socialist Republic, a federation within a federation. The Russian SFSR was divided in the early 1920s into some 30 autonomous ethnic territories (Autonomous Soviet Socialist Republics – ASSR and autonomous oblasts – AO), many of which exist to this day as ethnic republics within the Russian Federation. There was also a very large number of lower-level ethnic territories, such as national districts and national village soviets. The exact number of ASSR and AO varied over the years as new entities were created while old entities switched from one form to another, transformed into Union-level republics (e.g., Kazakh and Kyrgyz SSR created in 1936, Moldovan SSR created in 1940), or were absorbed into larger territories (e.g., Crimean ASSR absorbed into the RSFSR in 1945 and Volga German ASSR absorbed into RSFSR in 1941).

The first population census of the USSR in 1926 listed 176 distinct nationalities. Eliminating excessive detail (e.g., four ethnic groups for Jews and five ethnic groups for Georgians) and omitting very small ethnic groups, the list was condensed into 69 nationalities. These 69 nationalities lived in 45 nationally delimited territories, including 16 Union-level republics (SSR) for the major nationalities, 23 autonomous regions (18 ASSR and 5 autonomous oblasts) for other nationalities within the Russian SFSR, and 6 autonomous regions within other Union-level republics (one in Uzbek SSR, one in Azerbaijan SSR, one in Tajik SSR, and three in Georgian SSR).

Higher-level autonomous national territories in the Soviet Union

Map showing the ethnic republics of the Russian Federation (2008) that succeeded the national territories of Russian SFSR (pre-1990)

Despite the general policy of granting national territories to all ethnic groups, several nationalities remained without their own territories in the 1920s and the 1930s. In many cases these groups were either widely dispersed, or these minorities were concentrated in areas already designated as the national republic for a different group, for example Poles and Jews (who were considered a nationality) represented up to a third of the population in some areas of the Ukrainian or Belorussian SSRs or nearly half of the population in some cities and towns, yet apart from national raion's 24 of which were established in the Ukrainian SSR , no particular territorial entity was created (though a Jewish Autonomous Oblast was established in the Russian Far East in 1934). For the largely Yiddish-speaking Jews in these areas, policies were implemented such as the designation of Yiddish as an official language of Byelorussian SSR and a corresponding national public education system in Yiddish, along with the promotion of Yiddish literature and theatre in these areas as well as in the larger Russian cities. Other minorities included Bulgarians, Greeks, Hungarians, Romani, Uigurs, Koreans, and Gagauz (today the Gagauz live in a compact area known as Gagauzia in the south of Moldova, where they enjoy a measure of autonomy). The Volga Germans lost their national territory with the outbreak of World War II in 1941. The peoples of the North had neither autonomous republics nor autonomous oblasts, but since the 1930s they have been organized in 10 national okrugs, such as the Chukotka Autonomous Okrug, the Koryak Autonomous Okrug, the Nenets Autonomous Okrug, and others.

Besides national republics, oblasts, and okrugs, several hundred national districts (with populations between 10,000 and 50,000) and several thousand national townships (population 500 to 5,000) were established. In some cases this policy required voluntary or forced resettlement in both directions to create a compact population. The immigration of cross-border ethnic groups and the return of non-Russian émigrés to the Soviet Union during the New Economic Policy, albeit perceived as an easy cover for espionage, were not discouraged and proceeded quite actively, contributing to nation-building.

Soviet fear of foreign influence gained momentum from sporadic ethnic guerilla uprisings along the entire Soviet frontier throughout the 1920s. The Soviet government was particularly concerned about the loyalty of the Finnish, Polish, and German populations. However, in July 1925 the Soviet authorities felt secure enough and in order to project Soviet influence outwards, exploiting cross-border ethnic ties, granted national minorities in the border regions more privileges and national rights than those in the central regions. This policy was implemented especially successfully in the Ukrainian SSR, which at first indeed succeeded in attracting the population of Polish Kresy. However, some Ukrainian communists claimed neighboring regions even from the Russian SFSR.

National delimitation in Central Asia

Rationale
Russia had conquered Central Asia in the 19th century by annexing the formerly independent khanates of Kokand and Khiva and the Emirate of Bukhara. After the Communists took power in 1917 and created the Soviet Union it was decided to divide Central Asia into ethnically based republics in a process known as National Territorial Delimitation (NTD). This was in line with Communist theory that nationalism was a necessary step on the path towards an eventually communist society, and Joseph Stalin's definition of a nation as being “a historically constituted, stable community of people, formed on the basis of a common language, territory, economic life, and psychological make-up manifested in a common culture”.

Central Asia's borders are often viewed by critics of the USSR as being an attempt to divide and rule; a way to maintain Soviet hegemony over the region by artificially dividing its inhabitants into separate nations and with borders deliberately drawn so as to leave minorities within each state. Though the Soviets were concerned about the possible threat of pan-Turkic nationalism, as seen in its reaction to the Basmachi movement, closer analysis informed by the primary sources paints a much more nuanced picture than is commonly presented.

The Soviets aimed to create ethnically homogenous republics; however, many areas were ethnically mixed (especially the Ferghana Valley), which often proved difficult to assign a ‘correct’ ethnic label to some peoples (e.g. the mixed Tajik-Uzbek Sart, or the various Turkmen/Uzbek tribes along the Amu Darya). In addition, local elites often strongly argued (and in some cases, overstated) their case and the Russians were often forced to adjudicate between them, further hindered by a lack of expert knowledge and the paucity of accurate or up-to-date ethnographic data on the region. Furthermore, the NTD also aimed to create ‘viable’ entities, with economic, geographical, agricultural and infrastructural matters also to be taken into account and frequently trumping those of ethnicity. The attempt to balance these contradictory aims within an overall nationalist framework proved exceedingly difficult and often impossible, resulting in the drawing of convoluted borders, multiple enclaves and the unavoidable creation of large minorities who ended up living in the ‘wrong’ republic. Additionally, the Soviets never intended for these borders to become international frontiers.

Creation of new SSRs and autonomous regions
NTD of the area along ethnic lines had been proposed as early as 1920. At this time Central Asia consisted of two Autonomous Soviet Socialist Republics (ASSRs) within the Russian SFSR: the Turkestan ASSR, created in April 1918 and covering large parts of what are now southern Kazakhstan, Uzbekistan and Tajikistan, as well as Turkmenistan), and the Kirghiz Autonomous Soviet Socialist Republic (Kirghiz ASSR, Kirgizistan ASSR on the map), which was created on 26 August 1920 in the territory roughly coinciding with the northern part of today's Kazakhstan (at this time Kazakhs were referred to as ‘Kyrgyz’ and what are now the Kyrgyz were deemed a sub-group of the Kazakhs and referred to as ‘Kara-Kyrgyz’ i.e. ‘black Kyrgyz’). There were also the two separate successor ‘republics’ of the Emirate of Bukhara and the Khanate of Khiva, which were transformed into the Bukhara and Khorezm People's Soviet Republics following the takeover by the Red Army in 1920.

On 25 February 1924 the Politburo and Central Committee of the Soviet Union announced that it would proceed with NTD in Central Asia. The process was to be overseen by a Special Committee of the Central Asian Bureau, with three sub-committees for each of what were deemed to be the main nationalities of the region (Kazakhs, Turkmen and Uzbeks), with work then exceedingly rapidly. There were initial plans to possibly keep the Khorezm and Bukhara PSRs, but it was decided in April 1924 to partition them, over the often vocal opposition of their local Communist Parties. The Khorezm CP in particular were reluctant to destroy their PSR and had to be strong-armed into voting for their own dissolution in July of that year.

The Turkestan ASSR was officially partitioned into two Soviet Socialist Republics (SSR), the Turkmen SSR and the Uzbek SSR. The Turkmen SSR roughly matched the borders of today's Turkmenistan and it was created as a home for the Turkmens of Soviet Central Asia. The Bukhara and Khorezm People's Soviet Republics were largely absorbed into the Uzbek SSR, which also included other territories inhabited by Uzbeks as well as those inhabited by ethnic Tajiks. At the same time, the Tajik ASSR was created within the Uzbek SSR for the Tajik ethnic population and, in May 1929, it was separated from Uzbek SSR and upgraded to the status of a full Soviet Socialist Republic (the Tajik SSR). The Kirghiz SSR (today's Kyrgyzstan) was created only in 1936; between 1929 and 1936 it existed as the Kara-Kirghiz Autonomous Oblast (province) within the Russian SFSR. The Kazakh SSR was also created at that time (5 December 1936), thus completing the process of national delimitation of Soviet Central Asia into five Soviet Socialist Republics that in 1991 would become five independent states.

Particularly bitter debates accompanied the partition of the Uzbek and Tajik SSRs in 1929, focusing especially on the status of the cities of Bukhara, Samarkand, and the Surxondaryo Region, all of which had sizeable, if not dominant, Tajik populations. The final decision negotiated by the Uzbek and Tajik parties, not without strong involvement of the Communist Party, left these three largely Tajik-populated territories within the Turkic-populated Uzbek SSR. The Tajik SSR was created on 5 December 1929 as the home for most of the ethnic Tajiks in Soviet Central Asia within the boundaries of present-day Tajikistan.

Nation-building for ethnic minorities
In the 1920s and the 1930s, the policy of national delimitation, which assigned national territories to ethnic groups and nationalities, was followed by nation-building, attempting to create a full range of national institutions within each national territory. Each officially recognized ethnic minority, however small, was granted its own national territory where it enjoyed a certain degree of autonomy, in addition to national elites. A written national language was developed (if it had been lacking), national language planning was implemented, native teachers were trained, and national schools were established. This was always accompanied by native-language press and books written in the native language, along with other facets of cultural life. National elites were encouraged to develop and take over the leading administrative and Party positions, sometimes in proportions exceeding the proportion of the native population.

With the grain requisition crises, famines; troubled economic conditions; international destabilization and the reversal of the immigration flow in the early 1930s, the Soviet Union became increasingly worried about the possible disloyalty of diaspora ethnic groups with cross-border ties (especially Finns, Germans and Poles), residing along its western borders.  This eventually led to the start of Stalin's repressive policy towards them.

Following the introduction of the Soviet passport system in 1932, each adult citizen's ethnicity was necessarily recorded in their passport. Where parents' nationalities differed, a citizen was able to choose which nationality to register in their passport. This practice did not exist in the Russian empire and has been abolished in the Russian Federation, although it remains law in some former-Soviet republics, including Kazakhstan and Uzbekistan.

The Bolsheviks’ plan was to identify the total sum of all national, cultural, linguistic, and territorial diversities under their rule and establish scientific criteria to identify which groups of people were entitled to the description of 'nation'. This task relied on the existing work of tsarist-era ethnographers and statisticians, as well as new research conducted under Soviet auspices. Because most people did not know what is meant by a nation, some of them simply gave names when asked about ethnic group. Many groups were thought to be biologically similar, but culturally distinct. In Central Asia, many identified their "nation" as "Muslim." In other cases, geography made the difference, or even whether one lived in a town versus the countryside. Principally, however, dialects or languages formed the basis for distinguishing between various nations. The results were often contradictory and confusing. More than 150 nations were counted in Central Asia alone. Some were quickly subordinated to others, with communities which had hitherto been counted as "nations" now deemed to be simply tribes. As a result, the number of nations shrunk over the decades.

See also
Islam in the Soviet Union
Soviet people
Korenizatsiya
Soviet Central Asia

References
Notes

Citations

Further reading
John Everett-Heath (2003) Central Asia: History, Ethnicity, Modernity, Routledge-Curzon,  
Arne Haugen (2004) The Establishment of National Republics in Central Asia, Palgrave Macmillan, 
Terry Martin(2001). The Affirmative Action Empire: Nations and Nationalism in the Soviet Union, 1923-1939, Cornell University Press, 
Oliver Roy (2000) The New Central Asia: The Creation of Nations, NYU Press, 
Rogers Brubaker, Nationhood and the National Question in the Soviet Union and Post-Soviet Eurasia: An Institutionalist Account. Theory and Society, 23 [1] (February 1994): 47–78.

Subdivisions of the Soviet Union
Decentralization
Soviet internal politics
Soviet ethnic policy
Soviet phraseology
Soviet Union
Geography of the Soviet Union
Post-Soviet states
Federalism in the Soviet Union